The 1989 Lower Hutt mayoral election was part of the New Zealand local elections held that same year. The elections were held for the role of Mayor of Lower Hutt plus other local government positions including fifteen city councillors, also elected triennially. The polling was conducted using the standard first-past-the-post electoral method.

Background

The 1989 local elections were the first following a major overhaul of local government in New Zealand. The existing Lower Hutt City Council was renamed as the Hutt City Council after greatly expanding, absorbing several of the neighboring authorities including the Petone Borough Council, Eastbourne Borough Council and Hutt County Council as well as land on the waterfront formerly in the possession of the Wellington Harbour Board. Electoral reforms were implemented at the 1989 municipal elections, the method of electing councillors at large was replaced with a ward system of local electoral districts.

The incumbent mayor of Lower Hutt, Glen Evans, was re-elected in a landslide for the enlarged council and his United Citizens ticket won a large majority of council seats. The Mayor of Petone Ted Woolf and former Petone mayor Ron Marston, who were opposed to the borough's amalgamation with Lower Hutt, both stood as candidates. Both were defeated for the mayoralty but Woolf was elected a councillor for the new Harbour Ward (which incorporated Petone). Perennial candidate Nick Ursin of Lower Hutt and Stephen Dransfield from Wainuiomata were also candidates. Eastbourne mayor Ross Jamieson was defeated standing for a council seat for the Harbour Ward but was elected a member of the Eastbourne Community Board.

Mayoral results
The following table gives the election results:

Ward results
Candidates were also elected from wards to the Hutt City Council.

Notes

References

Mayoral elections in Lower Hutt
1989 elections in New Zealand
Politics of the Wellington Region